The Georgia Bulldogs baseball team represents the University of Georgia in NCAA Division I college baseball.

Along with most other Georgia athletic teams, the baseball team participates in the Eastern division of the Southeastern Conference.  Georgia won the College World Series in 1990.

The Bulldogs play their home games on UGA's campus in Foley Field, and are coached by head coach Scott Stricklin.

History

The Georgia Baseball team has seen most of its success in recent years, including winning the 1990 College World Series, as well as making the trip to Omaha in 1987, 1990, 2001, 2004, 2006, and 2008.

In its history, the team has claimed five Southeastern Conference tournament titles, in 1933, 1954, 1955, 2001, and 2004, and five regular season conference titles, in 1933, 1953, 1954, 2004, and 2008.

The program dates back to 1886 and, according to former Sports Information Director Dan Magill, was once the most popular sport on campus. However, from the mid-1950s to the late-1980s, and then through most of the 1990s, there were only scattered bright spots as the team managed only a modicum of success.

Since 2001, however, the program has enjoyed quite a resurgence, winning three championships in the perennial stalwart Southeastern Conference and participating in the College World Series four times in those eight seasons.

The Georgia-Georgia Tech baseball rivalry is one of the South's most fierce, and the teams' annual Spring Baseball Classic at Truist Park draws some of the largest crowds in college baseball (the 2004 game was seen by 28,836 spectators, the second-largest crowd in college baseball history).

Stadium
The Bulldogs play in the 3,291-seat Foley Field stadium.

Head coaches
The Bulldogs have had 25 head coaches in the history of their baseball program:

Records through the 2021 season.

National Championships

Georgia in the College World Series

Player awards

National awards
Baseball America Player of the Year Award
Derek Lilliquist (1983)
Baseball America Freshman of the Year Award
Ron Wenrich (1985)

SEC Awards
Pitcher of the Year
Joshua Fields (2008)
Player of the Year Award
Gordon Beckham (2008)

Georgia's 1st Team All-Americans

Bulldogs in Major League Baseball

Forty-nine former players have gone on to play at the Major League level, including four active players:
Kyle Farmer, shortstop, Cincinnati Reds
Justin Grimm, pitcher, Seattle Mariners
Jared Walsh, first baseman, Los Angeles Angels
Alex Wood, pitcher, San Francisco Giants

Other notable former players include:

Alf Anderson (1941–1946) – shortstop, Pittsburgh Pirates
Gordon Beckham (2009–2019), second baseman, Chicago White Sox, Los Angeles Angels, Atlanta Braves, San Francisco Giants, Seattle Mariners, Detroit Tigers
Marty Brown (1988–1990) – third baseman, Cincinnati Reds, Baltimore Orioles
Mitchell Boggs (2008-2013) - pitcher, St. Louis Cardinals
Cris Carpenter (1988–1996) – pitcher, St. Louis Cardinals, Florida Marlins, Texas Rangers, Milwaukee Brewers
Spud Chandler (1937–1947) – pitcher, New York Yankees
Glenn Davis (1984–1993) – first baseman, Houston Astros, Baltimore Orioles
Claud Derrick (1910–1914) – shortstop, Philadelphia Athletics, New York Yankees, Cincinnati Reds, Chicago Cubs
Hal Epps (1938–1944) – outfielder, St. Louis Cardinals, St. Louis Browns, Philadelphia Athletics
Josh Fields (2013–2018) – pitcher, Houston Astros, Los Angeles Dodgers
Jack Fisher (1959–1969) – pitcher, Baltimore Orioles, San Francisco Giants, New York Mets, Chicago White Sox, Cincinnati Reds
Dave Fleming (1991–1995) – pitcher, Seattle Mariners, Kansas City Royals
Robby Hammock (2003–2011) – catcher, Arizona Diamondbacks
Ken Holloway (1922–1930) – pitcher, Detroit Tigers, Cleveland Indians, New York Yankees
Derek Lilliquist (1989–1996) – pitcher, Atlanta Braves, San Diego Padres, Cleveland Indians, Boston Red Sox, Cincinnati Reds
Cy Moore (1929–1934) – pitcher, Brooklyn Robins/Dodgers, Philadelphia Phillies
Jim Nash (1966–1972) – pitcher, Kansas City/Oakland Athletics, Atlanta Braves, Philadelphia Phillies
Brian Powell (1998–2004) – pitcher, Detroit Tigers, Houston Astros, San Francisco Giants, Philadelphia Phillies
Nolen Richardson (1929–1939) – third baseman, Detroit Tigers, New York Yankees, Cincinnati Reds
Johnny Riddle (1930–1948) – catcher, Chicago White Sox, Washington Senators, Boston Braves, Cincinnati Reds, Pittsburgh Pirates
Johnny Rucker (1940–1946) – outfielder, New York Giants
Clint Sammons (2007–2009) – catcher, Atlanta Braves
Tully Sparks (1897–1910) – pitcher, Philadelphia Phillies, Pittsburgh Pirates, Milwaukee Brewers, New York Giants, Boston Americans
Jeff Treadway (1987–1995) – second baseman, Cincinnati Reds, Atlanta Braves, Cleveland Indians, Los Angeles Dodgers, Montreal Expos
Jim Umbricht (1959–1963) – pitcher, Pittsburgh Pirates, Houston Colt .45s
Mark Watson (2000–2003) – pitcher, Cleveland Indians, Seattle Mariners, Cincinnati Reds

See also

List of NCAA Division I baseball programs

References

External links
 

 
1886 establishments in Georgia (U.S. state)